USS Bataan (LHD-5) is a  in the United States Navy. The ship is named for the Battle of Bataan in the Philippines, during World War II.

Christening
Ship's sponsor, Linda Sloan Mundy, wife of former Marine Corps Commandant Gen Carl E. Mundy, Jr., christened the new ship "in the name of the United States and in honor of the heroic defenders of Bataan." at Ingalls Shipbuilding, Pascagoula, Mississippi. More than 100 members of veterans groups associated with both the Battle of Bataan and the infamous "Bataan Death March" that followed, as well as the Battle of Corregidor, and the aircraft carrier , were at the christening ceremony. She was commissioned on 20 September 1997.

History

2001 to 2003: Operation Enduring Freedom
The USS Bataan Amphibious Ready Group (ARG) were the first ships to respond after the 11 September 2001 attacks. The ship was home on leave during the attack and was scheduled to be deployed on 19 September 2001. The crew was called back from early leave and the ship headed for New York Harbor, as she is capable of acting as a 600-bed hospital ship with surgical suites on board. Once it was determined there were few survivors, Bataan returned to Norfolk, Virginia. The ship's crew prepared and onloaded the 26th Marine Expeditionary Unit with gear both pierside in Norfolk, and off the coast of North Carolina from Cherry Point and Camp Lejeune. The Bataan ARG delivered more than 2,500 Marines and their equipment to Pakistan with the aim to enter Afghanistan, thus opening Operation Enduring Freedom. The Bataan ARG stayed on station off the coast of Pakistan and completed the longest sustained amphibious assault in U.S. history with sailors not touching ground for over four months.

2003 to 2007: The Iraq War
Bataan was one of many vessels in the Middle East region at the beginning of the Iraq War on or about 20 March 2003. She has made two deployments to the region since the invasion. For her third deployment, she joined the Fifth Fleet in the Gulf region, transiting the Suez Canal into the Red Sea on 30 January 2007.

2005: Hurricane Katrina
Bataan provided relief to the victims of Hurricane Katrina. She was positioned near New Orleans prior to Katrina making landfall on 29 August, and began relief operations the following day. The ship's helicopters were among the first to provide damage assessment. They went on to transport over 1,600 displaced persons. The ship served as a base for two fly-away medical teams, consisting of 84 medical professionals, who provided emergency medical care in New Orleans.

2005: Evaluation of V-22 Osprey
Bataan served as a naval testbed for evaluation of the V-22 Osprey tiltrotor aircraft in September 2005. This work included OPEVAL II operational and live fire tests and was accomplished with eight Ospreys.

In 2009, Bataan became the first Navy ship to host an operational squadron of V-22 rotorcraft when she embarked ten Ospreys of the VMM-263.

2008: Hurricane Gustav
Early in September 2008, Bataan participated in the HURREX exercise where the U.S. Second Fleet directed tests designed to evaluate the ship's ability to respond to humanitarian assistance and disaster relief needs during the 2008 hurricane season. She was ordered to be prepared to deploy in the event that the Navy is directed to provide assistance to civilian authorities after Hurricane Gustav came ashore.

2008: Use as a prison ship
In June 2008, the UK-based human rights organization Reprieve issued a report that listed Bataan as one of up to 17 ships they believed were used to imprison terrorism suspects. 

2010: Haiti earthquake
On 13 January 2010, Bataan was ordered to assist in the humanitarian relief efforts following the 2010 Haiti earthquake. She was deployed to Grand-Goâve and returned home 1 April 2010.

2011: Libya and Italy 

On 23 March 2011, Bataan was deployed to Italy to assist in enforcing the no-fly zone over Libya.

2014: Air Campaign in Iraq
During the 2014 air campaign against the Islamic State in Iraq and Syria, AV-8B Harriers from Bataan participated in reconnaissance missions and at least one air strike, including the first use of Marine Corps ordnance against an ISIS-controlled target.

2016: Mark VI patrol boat operations

In May 2016, Bataan conducted well deck operations with the Mark VI patrol boat, demonstrating the capability to launch and dock the 85 ft patrol boat with an amphibious assault ship. This was the first time the Mark VI operated out of an LHD and the second time it operated out of a well deck overall.

2020: Iran's Increasing threat and tensions 
After killing Iranian Major General Qasem Soleimani of the Islamic Revolutionary Guard Corps (IRGC), commander of the Quds Force, which is designated a terrorist organization by the United States, the Bataan was retasked to head to the Middle East to be on standby for operations.

2022
On 19 January 2022, Bataan completed a sixteen-month maintenance at Norfolk.

Awards
National Defense Service Medal
Global War on Terrorism Expeditionary Medal with three service stars
Global War on Terrorism Service Medal
Humanitarian Service Medal with service star

References

External links 

 USS Bataan Homepage
 Maritimequest USS Bataan LHD-5 Photo Gallery
 OPEVAL II testing report in pdf form
 The case of the Taliban American CNN
 Navy ship nearby underused Chicago Tribune 4 September 2005 - Link Does Not Work
 Harrier carrier: Strike force for freedom
 USS Bataan history at U.S. Carriers
 

 

Wasp-class amphibious assault ships
Amphibious warfare vessels of the United States
Ships built in Pascagoula, Mississippi
1996 ships
2010 Haiti earthquake relief